Luino railway station is a border railway station in Italy. It divides the Swiss network (line to Cadenazzo) with the Italian one (line to Milan and line to Oleggio).

Luino is a frontier station between the Italian network, managed by Rete Ferroviaria Italiana, and the Swiss network, managed by Swiss Federal Railways.

Services 
 the following services stop at Luino:

References

External links
 
 Luino – RFI

Railway stations in Lombardy
Railway stations opened in 1882